Momence is a city and capital of Momence Township located in Kankakee County, Illinois, United States. The population was 3,171 at the 2000 census, and 3,310 in 2010. It is part of the Kankakee–Bradley Metropolitan Statistical Area.

Geography

Demographics

As of the census of 2000, there were 3,171 people, 1,159 households, and 784 families residing in the city. The racial makeup of the city was 89.18% White, 4.32% African American, 0.19% Native American, 0.09% Asian, 4.95% from other races, and 1.26% from two or more races. Hispanic or Latino of any race were 11.38% of the population.

There were 1,159 households, out of which 32.6% had children under the age of 18 living with them, 51.3% were married couples living together, 11.3% had a female householder with no husband present, and 32.3% were non-families. 27.6% of all households were made up of individuals, and 14.8% had someone living alone who was 65 years of age or older. The average household size was 2.59 and the average family size was 3.13.

In the city, the population was spread out, with 25.6% under the age of 18, 8.4% from 18 to 24, 27.3% from 25 to 44, 21.0% from 45 to 64, and 17.7% who were 65 years of age or older. The median age was 38 years. For every 100 females, there were 92.6 males. For every 100 females age 18 and over, there were 88.7 males.

The median income for a household in the city was $37,898, and the median income for a family was $45,379. Males had a median income of $31,741 versus $23,711 for females. The per capita income for the city was $17,836. About 5.8% of families and 9.2% of the population were below the poverty line, including 12.1% of those under age 18 and 6.4% of those age 65 or over.

History
First known as "Lower Crossing", Momence was named after a local Potawatomi, Isadore Moness.  Momence was first platted by Dr. Hiram Todd in 1846. It is located on the Kankakee River. In July, 1893, a crew paid for by an appropriation from the neighboring State of Indiana cut a shallow channel not quite a meter deep through a limestone ledge running just east of Momence, which had for millennia partially blocked and restricted the flow of the Kankakee River, making up to that point the Grand Kankakee Marsh, then the nation’s largest inland wetland, possible. The increased river flow, while doing little for the citizens of Illinois, drained thousands of acres of Indiana wetlands, permitting them to be profitably farmed, while destroying most of the Marsh.

Notable people

 Jeremy Michael Boorda, U.S. Navy Admiral and first American sailor to have risen through the enlisted ranks to become the Chief of Naval Operations. He was raised in Momence.
 Don Bacon, Republican member of the United States House of Representatives representing Nebraska's 2nd congressional district. He was raised in Momence.
 Eddie Condon, jazz musician. He was raised in Momence until moving to Chicago Heights, Illinois.
 William Crook (1925-1997), preacher turned politician, national director of the Volunteers in Service to America (VISTA) program and US Ambassador to Australia
 Orbert Davis, jazz trumpeter and bandleader. He was raised in Momence.
 Janet Hubert, actress. She appeared in the original Broadway cast of Cats and played Vivian Banks in The Fresh Prince of Bel-Air during the first three seasons. 
 Ted Petersen, offensive lineman for the Pittsburgh Steelers (1977–1983; 1987), Cleveland Browns (1984) and Indianapolis Colts (1984).
 Malcolm Ross, United States Naval Reserve captain, atmospheric scientist, and balloonist. He was born in Momence, but raised in West Lafayette, Indiana.
 John D. Zeglis, president of AT&T and the Chairman and C.E.O. of AT&T Wireless.

Pop culture

 Downtown Momence served as a setting for scenes in the 2002 movie, Road to Perdition.
 Momence’s downtown and neighborhood also served as the setting for the fourth season of “Fargo”, starring Chris Rock.

References

External links
 City of Momence

Cities in Illinois
Cities in Kankakee County, Illinois
Populated places established in 1846
1846 establishments in Illinois